Hartley Wood (5 April 1930 – 16 December 1988) was an Australian cricketer. He played in two first-class matches for South Australia in 1959/60.

See also
 List of South Australian representative cricketers

References

External links
 

1930 births
1988 deaths
Australian cricketers
South Australia cricketers
Cricketers from Adelaide